Club Omnisport Bouaflé (CO Bouaflé) is an Ivorian football club based in Bouaflé. The club is a member of the Ivorian Football Federation Premiere Division. They play at Stade de Yamoussoukro.

League participations
Ligue 1 (Ivory Coast): 2013–
Ligue 2 (Ivory Coast): ?-2013

Honours
Coupe de Côte d'Ivoire de football:2004

Performance in CAF competitions
2005 CAF Confederation Cup: Preliminary Round

References

External links
Soccerway
Futbol24

Football clubs in Ivory Coast
Sports clubs in Ivory Coast
Sport in Sassandra-Marahoué District
Marahoué